Gallarate railway station serves the town and comune of Gallarate, in the region of Lombardy, northern Italy. Opened in 1860, it is part of the Domodossola–Milan railway, and is a terminus of two secondary railways, Luino–Milan railway and Porto Ceresio–Milan railway.

The station is currently managed by Rete Ferroviaria Italiana (RFI). However, the commercial area of the passenger building is managed by Centostazioni. Each of these companies is a subsidiary of Ferrovie dello Stato (FS), Italy's state-owned rail company.

Train services are operated by Trenitalia, Trenord and TILO.

Location
Gallarate railway station is situated at Piazza Giovanni XXIII, on the southeastern edge of the city centre.

History 
The station was opened on 20 December 1860, together with the Rho–Gallarate section of the Rho–Arona railway.

On 24 July 1865, the next section of the Rho–Arona railway, from Gallarate to Sesto Calende, went into operation.  Two months later, on 26 September 1865, Gallarate became a junction station, for the newly opened Gallarate–Varese railway.

On 17 March 1884, another secondary line, the Gallarate–Laveno railway, commenced operations into Gallarate.

Features
The station yard has eight tracks, including five through tracks equipped with platforms:

 Track 1 is for direct trains to Domodossola, Geneva and Basel.
 Track 2 is for direct trains to Milano Centrale, Milano Porta Garibaldi coming from Domodossola/Luino.
 Track 3 is a through track used for terminating trains from Luino (via Gallarate–Laveno railway).
 Track 4 is a service track.
 Track 5 is used mainly by trains on line S5 of the Milan suburban railway network, and regional trains direct to Varese.
 Track 6 is used by trains on line S5 and regional trains from Varese.
 Tracks 7 and 8 are used by goods trains direct to Hupac's Busto Arsizio Terminal and to Switzerland via Luino or Domodossola.

Just beyond the station, towards Milan, is a goods yard, now abandoned, and a workshop for the maintenance of rolling stock.  The workshop has been closed for over ten years, but may eventually reopen.

Adjacent to track 1 is a State Police station, close to the Commissariat.

Passenger and train movements
The station has about 6.6 million passenger movements each year.

The passenger trains calling at the station are mainly regional services and Line S5 Milan suburban services.  The station is also served by two pairs of EuroCity trains providing connections between Milan and either Geneva or Basel.

See also

History of rail transport in Italy
List of railway stations in Lombardy
Rail transport in Italy

References

External links

 Gallarate – RFI

Buildings and structures in the Province of Varese
Railway stations in Lombardy
Railway stations opened in 1860
Milan S Lines stations